ZY, Z.Y., or Zy may refer to:

 ZY, a women's clothing chain by WE (clothing)
 ZY, a model of Mazda Z engine
 Sky Airlines (IATA code ZY)
 Zy.com, a company formed by ZyWeb
 ZY 1, also called CBERS-1, a satellite launched via the China–Brazil Earth Resources Satellite program
 2ZY, a radio station broadcast by BBC from Manchester, England in the 1920s
 ZY, assistant (with ZL and ZR) of Golden Age superhero Masked Marvel (Centaur Publications)

See also

 Ozy Media, whose logo is a "ZY" circumscribed by an "O"
 
 
 YZ (disambiguation)